Cem Öğretir (born 8 August 1973) is a Turkish TV presenter and reporter.

Life and career 
Öğretir was born in England and spent his childhood in Eskişehir. In 1995, he graduated from Anadolu University with a degree in cinema and television studies.

He had his first professional experience in 1995 after joining the crew of Mehmet Ali Birand's program 32. Gün on Show TV. In 1999, he left Show TV and started working for Star TV. A year later he joined CNN Türk and worked both as an editor and presenter. After leaving CNN Türk in 2005, he taught television courses at İletişim Academy. In 2008, at the offer of Fatih Altaylı, he joined Kanal 1 but his career there did not last long. Öğretir then joined Erdoğan Aktaş's team and presented the program Gün Ortası on Habertürk TV. After Aktaş's transfer to ATV, Öğretir officially started working for the channel on 10 August 2009 and became the main news bulletin presenter. In 2012, he taught presenting and diction courses at Burç College.

Since 2006 he has been married to fellow TV news presenter Seda Öğretir with whom he has a daughter.

Awards

References

External links 
 

1973 births
Turkish television news anchors
Anadolu University alumni
Golden Butterfly Award winners
Living people
People from Eskişehir